Twatt may refer to:

 Twatt, Orkney, Scotland
 Twatt, Shetland, Scotland

See also
 Twat (disambiguation)